Like Father, Like Daughter is a television series from Singapore.

Like Father, Like Daughter may also refer to:

 Like Father, Like Daughter, a novel by Anne Baker
 Like Father, Like Daughter?, a novel by Lori Copeland
 Like Father, Like Daughter, a collective reprint of issues #6-11 of Spider-Girl
 "Like Father, Like Daughter", an essay, by Abigail Garner, collected in Girls Who Like Boys Who Like Boys
 "Like Father, Like Daughter: The Beat Goes On", an article from The Mansfield News Journal about Stacy Dittrich and her father

Live-action television 
 "Like Father, Like Daughter" (Taxi), the pilot episode of Taxi
 "Like Father, Like Daughter", an episode of Coach with guest star Lisa Kudrow
 "Like Father, Like Daughter", an episode of American series Shameless
 "Like Father, Like Daughter", an episode of I Am Not Okay with This

Animated television 
 "Like Father, Like Daughter", an episode of He-Man and the Masters of the Universe
 "Like Father, Like Daughter", an episode of The Legend of Calamity Jane
 "Like Father, Like Daughter?", an episode of Defenders of the Earth
 "Like Father, Like Daughter", an episode of Noozles

See also 
 Like Father, Like Son (disambiguation)
 Like Mother, Like Daughter (disambiguation)